Pieter Gysbert Muller (born 5 May 1969) is a former international South Africa rugby union player. A centre, he was known for his strength and direct running.

Rugby union career
As a schoolboy, Muller represented Free State at the Craven Week tournaments in 1987 and 1988 and on both occasions were selected for the SA Schools team. He made his provincial debut for Free State in 1990, after spending some time playing club rugby in Ireland for Greystones R.F.C. In 1992, Muller joined Natal and was a member of the Currie Cup winning team in 1992. He suffered a serious neck injury early in 1995 that required time away from rugby, after which he tried rugby league and spent time in France playing for Toulouse. In 1997, Muller returned to the Sharks and in 2000 he joined Cardiff Blues in Wales.

His first test match for the Springboks was in 1992 against the All Blacks at Ellis Park in Johannesburg and he scored a try on debut. Muller played 33 test matches for the Springboks and was a member of the 1999 World Cup squad. His last test match for South Africa was the third place playoff at the 1999 World Cup against New Zealand at the Millennium Stadium in Cardiff. Muller also played in 19 tour matches for the Springboks and scored 7 tries.

Test history

Rugby league
In 1996, Muller also had an unsuccessful stint playing for Australian rugby league side Penrith Panthers, in the Winfield Cup, making only a handful of appearances in the two years of his contract. Muller then returned to South Africa and club rugby before once again representing the Springboks.

Accolades
Muller was voted as one of the five Young Players of the Year for 1991, along with Hennie le Roux, Pieter Hendriks, Johan Nel and Jacques Olivier.

Personal
He is the brother of Helgard Muller, also former Springboks rugby player. Muller resides in Cape Town (Hout Bay) and is closely involved with the SA Rugby Legends.

See also
List of South Africa national rugby union players – Springbok no. 560
List of South Africa national under-18 rugby union team players

References

External links

 

1969 births
Living people
South African rugby union players
South Africa international rugby union players
Cardiff Rugby players
Greystones RFC players
Sharks (Currie Cup) players
Sharks (rugby union) players
Alumni of Grey College, Bloemfontein
Rugby union players from Bloemfontein
Rugby union centres